Estell Manor School District is a community public school district in Estell Manor, in Atlantic County, New Jersey, United States, serving students in kindergarten through eighth grade.

As of the 2021–22 school year, the district, comprised of one school, had an enrollment of 181 students and 16.0 classroom teachers (on an FTE basis), for a student–teacher ratio of 11.3:1. In the 2016–17 school year, Estell Manor was the 36th-smallest enrollment of any school district in the state, with 172 students.

The district is classified by the New Jersey Department of Education as being in District Factor Group "DE", the fifth highest of eight groupings. District Factor Groups organize districts statewide to allow comparison by common socioeconomic characteristics of the local districts. From lowest socioeconomic status to highest, the categories are A, B, CD, DE, FG, GH, I and J.

For ninth through twelfth grades, public school students attend Buena Regional High School, which serves students from Buena Borough and Buena Vista Township, together with students from Estell Manor City and Weymouth Township who attend the school as part of sending/receiving relationships with the Buena Regional School District. As of the 2021–22 school year, the high school had an enrollment of 498 students and 48.0 classroom teachers (on an FTE basis), for a student–teacher ratio of 10.4:1.

City public school students are also eligible to attend the Atlantic County Institute of Technology in the Mays Landing section of Hamilton Township or the Charter-Tech High School for the Performing Arts, located in Somers Point.

In 2013–2016, under Superintendent Noëlle Jacquelin, the district had no tax increase for three consecutive years. Voters passed a multimillion-dollar building project referendum, and the district was awarded an $800,000 grant from the New Jersey Schools Development Authority to cover project costs.

Awards and recognition
Estell Manor School was named as a "Star School" by the New Jersey Department of Education, the highest honor that a New Jersey school can achieve, in the 1994–95 school year

The district received "High Achieving" district status during the New Jersey Department of Education's QSAC evaluation.

School
Estell Manor Elementary School had an enrollment of 180 students as of the 2021–22 school year.

Administration
Core members of the district's administration are:
Michelle Cappelluti, Interim Superintendent
Rose Millar, Business Administrator / Board Secretary

Board of education
The district's board of education, comprised of five members, sets policy and oversees the fiscal and educational operation of the district through its administration. As a Type II school district, the board's trustees are elected directly by voters to serve three-year terms of office on a staggered basis, with either one or two seats up for election each year held (since 2012) as part of the November general election. The board appoints a superintendent to oversee the district's day-to-day operations and a business administrator to supervise the business functions of the district.

References

External links
Estell Manor School District Website

School Data for the Estell Manor School, National Center for Education Statistics
Buena Regional High School

Estell Manor, New Jersey
New Jersey District Factor Group DE
School districts in Atlantic County, New Jersey
Public K–8 schools in New Jersey